Frank McElyea (August 4, 1918 – April 19, 1987) was a Major League Baseball player. He played seven games with the Boston Braves between September 10 and 26, 1942.

McElyea served in the United States Army for three years (1943–1945)  during World War II.

McElyea died on April 19, 1987.

References

External links

Boston Braves players
Major League Baseball outfielders
1918 births
1987 deaths
Baseball players from Illinois
Owensboro Oilers players
Evansville Bees players
Hartford Bees players
Evansville Braves players